

Oberführer (short: Oberf) was an early paramilitary rank of the Nazi Party (NSDAP) dating back to 1921. An Oberführer was typically an NSDAP member in charge of a group of paramilitary units in a particular geographical region. From 1921 to 1925, the phrase Oberführer was used as a title in the Sturmabteilung (SA), but became an actual SA rank after 1926.

Oberführer was also a rank of the Schutzstaffel (SS, at that time a branch of the SA), established in 1925 as Gauführer, a rank for SS officers in charge of SS personnel in the several Gaue throughout Germany; in 1928 the rank was renamed Oberführer, and used of the commanders of the three regional SS-Oberführerbereiche. In 1930, the SS was reorganized into SS-Gruppen and Brigaden, at which time Oberführer became subordinate to the higher rank of Brigadeführer. By 1932, Oberführer was an established rank of the SA, SS and NSKK.

Oberführer wore two oak leaves on the uniform collar rank patch, along with the shoulder boards and lapels of a general officer. In 1938, the status of SS-Oberführer began to change with the rise of the SS-Verfügungstruppe (SS-VT), which would later become the Waffen-SS. Since Brigadeführer was rated equal to a Generalmajor, and Standartenführer to an Oberst, Oberführer had no military equivalent and quickly became regarded as a senior colonel rank. This distinction continues in historical circles with most texts referring to Oberführer as a senior colonel rank while some others state it was a military equivalent to a British Army brigadier.

Rank insignia

See also
Corps colours (Waffen-SS)
Table of ranks and insignia of the Waffen-SS

Notes

Bibliography

!
SS ranks